The 2010–11 Tennessee Tech Golden Eagles men's basketball team represented Tennessee Tech University in the 2010–11 NCAA Division I men's basketball season. The Golden Eagles, led by head coach Mike Sutton, played their home games at the Eblen Center in Cookeville, Tennessee, as members of the Ohio Valley Conference. The Golden Eagles finished 4th in the OVC during the regular season, and advanced to the championship game of the OVC tournament after upsetting top-seeded Murray State. Tennessee Tech fell in the championship game to Morehead State, 80-73.

Tennessee Tech failed to qualify for the NCAA tournament, but were invited to the 2011 CIT. The Golden Eagles were eliminated in the first round of the CIT by Western Michigan, 74–66.

This was head coach Mike Sutton's last season at the helm with the Golden Eagles; shortly after the season, he retired due to his ongoing battle with Guillain–Barré syndrome.

Roster 

Source

Schedule and results

|-
!colspan=9 style=|Exhibition

|-
!colspan=9 style=|Regular season

|-
!colspan=9 style=| Ohio Valley tournament

|-
!colspan=9 style=| CollegeInsider.com tournament

Source

References

Tennessee Tech Golden Eagles men's basketball seasons
Tennessee Tech
Tennessee Tech
Tennessee Tech men's basketball
Tennessee Tech men's basketball